Sick building syndrome (SBS) is a condition in which people develop symptoms of illness or become infected with chronic disease from the building in which they work or reside. 

The main identifying observation is an increased incidence of complaints of symptoms such as headache, eye, nose, and throat irritation, fatigue, dizziness, and nausea. In fact the 1989 Oxford English Dictionary defines SBS in that way. The World Health Organization created a 484-page tome on indoor air quality back in 1984 when SBS was attributed only to non-organic causes, and suggested that the book might form a basis for legislation or litigation.

The outbreaks may or may not be a direct result of inadequate cleaning or inappropriate cleaning methods. SBS has also been used to describe staff concerns in post-war buildings with misplanned building aerodynamics, defects in the construction materials or assembly process and-or inadequate maintenance. Certain symptoms tend to increase in severity with the time people spend in the building; often improving over time or even disappearing when people are away from the building. SBS is also used interchangeably with "building-related symptoms", which orients the name of the condition around patients' symptoms rather than a "sick" building.

Attempts have been made to connect Sick Building Syndrome to various causes, such as contaminants produced by outgassing of some types of building materials, volatile organic compounds (VOC), improper exhaust ventilation of ozone (byproduct of some office machinery), light industrial chemicals used within, or lack of adequate fresh-air intake/air filtration (see minimum efficiency reporting value). Sick building Syndrome has also been attributed to heating, ventilation, and air conditioning (HVAC) systems. However, there have been inconsistent findings on whether air conditioning systems result in SBS or not.

Signs and symptoms

Human exposure to aerosols has been documented to give rise to a variety of adverse health effects. Building occupants complain of symptoms such as sensory irritation of the eyes, nose, or throat; neurotoxic or general health problems; skin irritation; nonspecific hypersensitivity reactions; infectious diseases; and odor and taste sensations. Exposure to poor lighting conditions has led to general malaise.

Extrinsic allergic alveolitis has been associated with the presence of fungi and bacteria in the moist air of residential houses and commercial offices. A study in 2017 correlated several inflammatory diseases of the respiration tract with objective evidence of damp-caused damage in homes.

The WHO has classified the reported symptoms into broad categories, including: mucous membrane irritation (eye, nose, and throat irritation), neurotoxic effects (headaches, fatigue, and irritability), asthma and asthma-like symptoms (chest tightness and wheezing), skin dryness and irritation, gastrointestinal complaints and more.

Several sick occupants may report individual symptoms which do not appear to be connected. The key to discovery is the increased incidence of illnesses in general with onset or exacerbation within a fairly close time frame – usually within a period of weeks. In most cases, SBS symptoms will be relieved soon after the occupants leave the particular room or zone. However, there can be lingering effects of various neurotoxins, which may not clear up when the occupant leaves the building. In some cases – particularly in sensitive individuals – there can be long-term health effects.

Cause
ASHRAE has recognized that polluted urban air, designated within the United States Environmental Protection Agency (EPA)'s air quality ratings as unacceptable, requires the installation of treatment such as filtration for which the HVAC practitioners generally apply carbon-impregnated filters and their likes. Different toxins will aggravate the human body in different ways. Some people are more allergic to mold, while others are highly sensitive to dust. Inadequate ventilation will exaggerate small problems (such as deteriorating fiberglass insulation or cooking fumes) into a much more serious indoor air quality problem. Common products such as paint, insulation, rigid foam, Particle Board, plywood, duct liners, exhaust fumes and other chemical contaminants from indoor or outdoor sources, and biological contaminants can be trapped inside by the HVAC AC system. As this air is recycled using fan coils the overall oxygenation ratio drops and becomes harmful. When combined with other stress factors such as traffic noise, poor lighting, inhabitants of buildings located in a polluted urban area can quickly become ill as their immune system is overwhelmed. Certain VOCs, considered toxic chemical contaminants to humans, are used as adhesives in all common building construction products. These aromatic carbon rings / VOCs can cause acute and chronic health effects on the occupants of a building, including cancer, paralysis, lung failure, and others. Bacterial spores, fungal spores, mold spores, pollen, and viruses are types of biological contaminants and can all cause allergic reactions or illness described as SBS. In addition, pollution from outdoors, such as motor vehicle exhaust, can infiltrate into poorly designed buildings and contribute to poor indoor air quality, high ppm of CO and CO2. Adult SBS symptoms were associated with a history of allergic rhinitis, eczema and asthma.

A 2015 study concerning the association of SBS and indoor air pollutants in office buildings in Iran found that, as carbon dioxide levels increase in a building, symptoms like nausea, headaches, nasal irritation, dyspnea, and throat dryness have also been shown to increase. Certain work conditions have been found to be correlated with specific symptoms. For example, higher light intensity was significantly related to skin dryness, eye pain, and malaise. Higher temperature has also been found to correlate with symptoms such as sneezing, skin redness, itchy eyes and headache, while lower relative humidity has been associated with sneezing, skin redness, and pain of the eyes.

As of the 2016 revision, ASHRAE ventilation standards call for 5 to 10 cubic feet per minute of ventilation per occupant (depending on the occupancy type) in addition to ventilation based on the zone floor area delivered to the breathing zone.

Psychological factors
One study looked at commercial buildings and their employees, comparing some environmental factors suspected of inducing SBS to a self-reported survey of the occupants, finding that the measured psycho-social circumstances appeared more influential than the tested environmental factors. The authors of that study pointed to the self-reported nature of the observations as a limitation of the research.

Research has shown that SBS shares several symptoms common in other conditions thought to be at least partially caused by psychosomatic tendencies. The umbrella term "autoimmune/inflammatory syndrome induced by adjuvants" has been suggested. Other members of the suggested group include silicosis, macrophagic myofascitis, Gulf War syndrome, and post-vaccination phenomena.

Workplace 
Greater effects were found with features of the psycho-social work environment including high job demands and low support. The report concluded that the physical environment of office buildings appears to be less important than features of the psycho-social work environment in explaining differences in the prevalence of symptoms. However, there is still a relationship between sick building syndrome and symptoms of workers regardless of workplace stress.

Excessive work stress or dissatisfaction, poor interpersonal relationships and poor communication are often seen to be associated with SBS, recent studies show that a combination of environmental sensitivity and stress can greatly contribute to sick building syndrome.

Specific work-related stressors are related with specific SBS symptoms. Workload and work conflict are significantly associated with general symptoms (headache, abnormal tiredness, sensation of cold or nausea). While crowded workspaces and low work satisfaction are associated with upper respiratory symptoms. Work productivity has been associated with ventilation rates, a contributing factor to SBS, and there's a significant increase in production as ventilation rates increase, by 1.7% for every two-fold increase of ventilation rate. Printer effluent, released into the office air as ultra-fine particles (UFPs) as toner is burned during the printing process, may lead to certain SBS symptoms. Printer effluent may contain a variety of toxins to which a subset of office workers are sensitive, triggering SBS symptoms.

Specific careers are also associated with specific SBS symptoms. Transport, communication, healthcare, and social workers have highest prevalence of general symptoms. Skin symptoms such as eczema, itching, and rashes on hands and face are associated with technical work. Forestry, agriculture, and sales workers have the lowest rates of sick building syndrome symptoms.

From the assessment done by Fisk and Mudarri, 21% of asthma cases in the United States were caused by wet environments with mold that exist in all indoor environments, such as schools, office buildings, houses and apartments. Fisk and Berkeley Laboratory colleagues also found that the exposure to the mold increases the chances of respiratory issues by 30 to 50 percent. Additionally, studies showing that health effects with dampness and mold in indoor environments found that increased risk of adverse health effects occurs with dampness or visible mold environments.

Milton et al. determined the cost of sick leave specific for one business was an estimated $480 per employee, and about five days of sick leave per year could be attributed to low ventilation rates. When comparing low ventilation rate areas of the building to higher ventilation rate areas, the relative risk of short-term sick leave was 1.53 times greater in the low ventilation areas.

Home 
Sick building syndrome can also occur due to factors of the home. Laminate flooring can cause more exposure to chemicals and more resulting SBS symptoms compared to stone, tile, and cement flooring. Recent redecorating and new furnishings within the last year were also found to be associated with increased symptoms, along with dampness and related factors, having pets, and the presence of cockroaches. The presence of mosquitoes was also a factor related to more symptoms, though it is unclear whether it was due to the presence of mosquitoes or the use of repellents.

Mold 
Some studies have found that sick building syndrome may be associated with indoor mould or mycotoxin contamination. However, the attribution of sick building syndrome to mould is controversial and supported by little evidence. Reducing the dampness in all indoor environment will prevent all the respiratory issues caused by dampness and mold in indoor environment.

Indoor temperature 

Indoor temperature under 18 °C (64 °F) has been shown to be associated with increased respiratory and cardiovascular diseases, increased blood levels, and increased hospitalization.

Diagnosis 
While sick building syndrome (SBS) encompasses a multitude of non-specific symptoms, building-related illness (BRI) comprises specific, diagnosable symptoms caused by certain agents (chemicals, bacteria, fungi, etc.). These can typically be identified, measured, and quantified. There are usually 4 causal agents in BRI; 1.) Immunologic, 2.) Infectious, 3.) toxic, and 4.) irritant. For instance, Legionnaire's disease, usually caused by Legionella pneumophila, involves a specific organism which could be ascertained through clinical findings as the source of contamination within a building.

Prevention
 Reduce the time you stay in the building
 If you live there, consider moving to a new place
 Regular inspections to indicate for presence of mold or other toxins
 Adequate maintenance of all building mechanical systems
 Toxin-absorbing plants, such as sansevieria
 Roof shingle non-pressure cleaning for removal of algae, mold, and Gloeocapsa magma
 Using ozone to eliminate the many sources, such as VOCs, molds, mildews, bacteria, viruses, and even odors. However, numerous studies identify high-ozone shock treatment as ineffective despite commercial popularity and popular belief.
 Replacement of water-stained ceiling tiles and carpeting
 Only using paints, adhesives, solvents, and pesticides in well-ventilated areas or only using these pollutant sources during periods of non-occupancy
 Increasing the number of air exchanges; the American Society of Heating, Refrigeration and Air-Conditioning Engineers recommend a minimum of 8.4 air exchanges per 24-hour period
 Increased ventilation rates that are above the minimum guidelines
 Proper and frequent maintenance of HVAC systems
 UV-C light in the HVAC plenum
 Installation of HVAC air cleaning systems or devices to remove VOCs and bioeffluents (people odors)
 Central vacuums that completely remove all particles from the house including the ultrafine particles (UFPs) which are less than 0.1 μm
 Regular vacuuming with a HEPA filter vacuum cleaner to collect and retain 99.97% of particles down to and including 0.3 micrometers
 Placing bedding in sunshine, which is related to a study done in a high-humidity area where damp bedding was common and associated with SBS
 Lighting in the workplace should be designed to give individuals control, and be natural when possible
 Relocating office printers outside the air conditioning boundary, perhaps to another building
 Replacing current office printers with lower emission rate printers
 Identification and removal of products containing harmful ingredients

Management 
SBS, as a non specific blanket term, does not have any specific cause or cure. Any known cure would be associated with the specific eventual disease that was cause by exposure to known contaminants. In all cases, alleviation consists of removing the affected person from the building associated. BRI, on the other hand, utilizes treatment appropriate for the contaminant identified within the building (e.g., antibiotics for Legionnaire's disease).

In most cases, simply improving the indoor air quality (IAQ) of a particular building will attenuate, or even eliminate, the continued exposure to toxins. For the individual, the recovery may be a process involved with targeting the acute symptoms of a specific illness, as in the case of mold toxins. Treating various building-related illnesses is vital to the overall understanding of SBS. Careful analysis by certified building professionals and Medical Doctors can help to identify the exact cause of the BRI, and help to illustrate a causal path to infection. With this knowledge one can, theoretically, remediate a building of contaminants and rebuild the structure with new materials. Office BRI may more likely than not be explained by three events: "Wide range in the threshold of response in any population (susceptibility), a spectrum of response to any given agent, or variability in exposure within large office buildings." Isolating any one of the three aspects of office BRI can be a great challenge, which is why those who find themselves with BRI should take three steps, history, examinations, and interventions. History describes the action of continually monitoring and recording the health of workers experiencing BRI, as well as obtaining records of previous building alterations or related activity. Examinations go hand in hand with monitoring employee health. This step is done by physically examining the entire workspace and evaluating possible threats to health status among employees. Interventions follow accordingly based on the results of the Examination and History report.

Epidemiology 
Some studies have found that women have higher reports of SBS symptoms than men. It is not entirely clear, however, if this is due to biological, social, or occupational factors.

A 2001 study published in the Journal Indoor Air, gathered 1464 office-working participants to increase the scientific understanding of gender differences under the Sick Building Syndrome phenomenon. Using questionnaires, ergonomic investigations, building evaluations, as well as physical, biological, and chemical variables, the investigators obtained results that compare with past studies of SBS and gender. The study team found that across most test variables, prevalence rates were different in most areas, but there was also a deep stratification of working conditions between genders as well. For example, men's workplaces tend to be significantly larger and have all-around better job characteristics. Secondly, there was a noticeable difference in reporting rates, specifically that women have higher rates of reporting roughly 20% higher than men. This information was similar to that found in previous studies, thus indicating a potential difference in willingness to report.

There might be a gender difference in reporting rates of sick building syndrome, because women tend to report more symptoms than men do. Along with this, some studies have found that women have a more responsive immune system and are more prone to mucosal dryness and facial erythema. Also, women are alleged by some to be more exposed to indoor environmental factors because they have a greater tendency to have clerical jobs, wherein they are exposed to unique office equipment and materials (example: blueprint machines, toner-based printers), whereas men often have jobs based outside of offices.

History

In the late 1970s, it was noted that nonspecific symptoms were reported by tenants in newly constructed homes, offices, and nurseries. In media it was called "office illness". The term "sick building syndrome" was coined by the WHO in 1986, when they also estimated that 10–30% of newly built office buildings in the West had indoor air problems. Early Danish and British studies reported symptoms.

Poor indoor environments attracted attention. The Swedish allergy study (SOU 1989:76) designated "sick building" as a cause of the allergy epidemic as was feared. In the 1990s, therefore, extensive research into "sick building" was carried out. Various physical and chemical factors in the buildings were examined on a broad front.

The problem was highlighted increasingly in media and was described as a "ticking time bomb". Many studies were performed in individual buildings.

In the 1990s "sick buildings" were contrasted against "healthy buildings". The chemical contents of building materials were highlighted. Many building material manufacturers were actively working to gain control of the chemical content and to replace criticized additives. The ventilation industry advocated above all more well-functioning ventilation. Others perceived ecological construction, natural materials, and simple techniques as a solution.

At the end of the 1990s came an increased distrust of the concept of "sick building". A dissertation at the Karolinska Institutet in Stockholm 1999 questioned the methodology of previous research, and a Danish study from 2005 showed these flaws experimentally. It was suggested that sick building syndrome was not really a coherent syndrome and was not a disease to be individually diagnosed, but a collection of as many as to dozen semi related diseases. In 2006 the Swedish National Board of Health and Welfare recommended in the medical journal Läkartidningen that "sick building syndrome" should not be used as a clinical diagnosis. Thereafter, it has become increasingly less common to use terms such as "sick buildings" and "sick building syndrome" in research. However, the concept remains alive in popular culture and is used to designate the set of symptoms related to poor home or work environment engineering. "Sick building" is therefore an expression used especially in the context of workplace health.

Sick building syndrome made a rapid journey from media to courtroom where professional engineers and architects became named defendants and were represented by their respective professional practice insurers. Proceedings invariably relied on expert witnesses, medical and technical experts along with building managers, contractors and manufacturers of finishes and furnishings, testifying as to cause and effect. Most of these actions resulted in sealed settlement agreements, none of these being dramatic. The insurers needed a defense based upon Standards of Professional Practice to meet a court decision that declared that in a modern, essentially sealed building, the HVAC systems must produce breathing air for suitable human consumption. ASHRAE (American Society of Heating, Refrigeration and Air Conditioning Engineers, currently with over 50,000 international members) undertook the task of codifying its indoor air quality (IAQ) standard.

ASHRAE empirical research determined that "acceptability" was a function of outdoor (fresh air) ventilation rate and used carbon dioxide as an accurate measurement of occupant presence and activity. Building odors and contaminants would be suitably controlled by this dilution methodology. ASHRAE codified a level of 1,000 ppm of carbon dioxide and specified the use of widely available sense-and-control equipment to assure compliance. The 1989 issue of ASHRAE 62.1-1989 published the whys and wherefores and overrode the 1981 requirements that were aimed at a ventilation level of 5,000 ppm of carbon dioxide (the OSHA workplace limit), federally set to minimize HVAC system energy consumption. This apparently ended the SBS epidemic.

Over time, building materials changed with respect to emissions potential. Smoking vanished and dramatic improvements in ambient air quality, coupled with code compliant ventilation and maintenance, per ASHRAE standards have all contributed to the acceptability of the indoor air environment.

See also
 List of diagnoses characterized as pseudoscience
 Aerotoxic syndrome
 Air purifier
 Asthmagen
 Cleanroom
 Electromagnetic hypersensitivity
 Havana syndrome
 Healthy building
 Indoor air quality
 Lead paint
 Multiple chemical sensitivity
 NASA Clean Air Study
 Nosocomial infection
 Particulate
 Power tools
 Renovation
 Somatization disorder
 Fan death

References

Further reading
 Martín-Gil J., Yanguas M. C., San José J. F., Rey-Martínez and Martín-Gil F. J. "Outcomes of research into a sick hospital". Hospital Management International, 1997, pp. 80–82. Sterling Publications Limited.
 Åke Thörn, The Emergence and preservation of sick building syndrome, KI 1999.
 Charlotte Brauer, The sick building syndrome revisited, Copenhagen 2005.
 Michelle Murphy, Sick Building Syndrome and the Problem of Uncertainty, 2006.
 Johan Carlson, "Gemensam förklaringsmodell för sjukdomar kopplade till inomhusmiljön finns inte" [Unified explanation for diseases related to indoor environment not found]. Läkartidningen 2006/12.
 Bulletin of the Transilvania University of Braşov, Series I: Engineering Sciences • Vol. 5 (54) No. 1  2012 "Impact of Indoor Environment Quality on Sick Building Syndrome in Indian Leed Certified Buildings". by Jagannathan Mohan

External links 
 Best Practices for Indoor Air Quality when Remodeling Your Home, US EPA
 Renovation and Repair, Part of Indoor Air Quality Design Tools for Schools, US EPA
 Addressing Indoor Environmental Concerns During Remodeling, US EPA
 Dust FAQs, UK HSE
 CCOHS: Welding - Fumes And Gases 

Ailments of unknown cause
Building biology
Environmental toxicology
Air pollution
Building defects
Syndromes
Mass psychogenic illness